The Director of the Foreign Intelligence Service of the RF (D/SVR) serves as the head of the Foreign Intelligence Service, which is one of several Russian intelligence agencies. The Director of SVR reports directly to the President of Russia.

The Director is assisted by the Deputy Director, and he is a civilian or a general or flag officer of the armed forces. The Director is appointed by the President, with the concurring or nonconcurring recommendation from the Head of Security Council.

History  
On 26 December 1991, Boris Yeltsin appointed the Director of newly created SVR Yevgeni Primakov who led the organization for six years.

The current director is Sergey Naryshkin, who took over on 22 September 2016.

List of directors

References

Foreign Intelligence Service (Russia)
Russia